Kiril Jacob Kulish (born February 16, 1994) is an American actor, singer and dancer who is best known for portraying the title role in the original American production of Billy Elliot the Musical, which earned him a Tony Award for Best Actor in a Leading Role in a Musical, making him one of the youngest winners of the award.

Early and personal life  
Kulish was born in San Diego, California on February 16, 1994. His parents, Raisa Kulish and Phil Axelrod, are Jewish immigrants from Ukraine. His older brother, Victor, is a singer/songwriter and recording engineer, and his older sister Beata is a TV/film producer. He grew up speaking Russian, Ukrainian, and English. He started studying ballet at age five and ballroom dancing at age 8.  He studied at the San Diego Academy of Ballet, and was the youngest male to be admitted to their junior company.  Kiril was the winner of the Junior division Grand Prix at the Youth America Grand Prix in 2006, 2007, and 2008  and won the Hope Award in the Pre-Competitive division in 2006.
Kiril Kulish won first place in Latin Ballroom at the USA National Dance Championships in 2006 and 2007.  
In 2012 and 2013 Kiril Kulish became the Youth  USA Champion in Latin Dance Sport and will represent USA in Beijing  and Paris .

Acting career

Billy Elliot the Musical 
At a press launch in New York on April 22, 2008, it was announced that Kulish would be one of three boys to play the title role in the original Broadway production of Billy Elliot the Musical, along with David Álvarez and Trent Kowalik. Kulish performed in the musical's first preview performance on October 1, 2008.  On June 7, 2009, Kulish, along with Trent Kowalik and David Álvarez, won the Tony Award for Best Actor in a Leading Role in a Musical, becoming one of the youngest winners of the award.  In all, Billy Elliot was nominated for 15 Tony Awards, and won 10, including Best Musical and Best Book of a Musical.  Kulish's last performance in Billy Elliot was on Saturday October 3, 2009.

Later Work

Film:  													
Sonata 	(Pre-Production)			Landon Goldberg		
	
Crossing 					Young Andrei

Damaged					        Brad

Choreographer	
									
Chasing Mem’ries Musical at the Geffen Playhouse starring Tyne Daly and Robert Forster

 Television: 		
												
Dancing with the Stars				Pro

HBO Anthology Series				Secret Service Style Agent-Co Star

The 63rd Annual Tony Awards			Himself

Good Morning America				Himself

NBC Sports Special				Himself	
		
ABC The View					Billy Elliot
		
ABC Live with Regis and Kelly   		Himself	

ABC Live with Regis and Michael   		Himself	
			
CBS Morning Show				Himself		
			
ABC Daytime Salutes BC/EFA			Himself		
(Full List Available upon request)

Theater/Performance:													
“Baz — A Musical Tour de Force”  Las Vegas (Baz Lehrman show)

In late 2009, Kulish performed the lead role in the ballet The Nutcracker.  In 2010, he attended the ballroom championship at USA Dance Southwest Regional Championship in Long Beach, CA.  On October 27, 2012, Kiril performed alongside Jon Secada, Debbie Gravitte, Liz Callaway, and a host of award-winning singers from around the world in Loving the Silent Tears: A New Musical at the Shrine Theater in Los Angeles. In 2016, Kulish joined season 22 of Dancing with the Stars as a professional dancer in their troupe.
Kulish currently resides in San Diego, Los Angeles, and New York.

Theatre credits

Accolades

References

External links
 
 
 

1994 births
American male child actors
American people of Ukrainian-Jewish descent
American male stage actors
Jewish American male actors
Living people
Male actors from San Diego
Theatre World Award winners
Tony Award winners
American male dancers
American male musical theatre actors
21st-century American Jews